Yeki Bud Yeki Nabud is a collection of short stories written in 1921 by Mohammad Ali Jamalzadeh. Its publication made Jamalzadeh a major figure in the Persian literature.

The literal translation of the phrase Yeki Bud Yeki Nabud (Once Upon a Time) is One Was There and One Was Not There, or There Was One and There Wasn't One, alluding to an indefinite time and place. Opening a story by Yeki Bud Yeki Nabud prepares the hearers (especially those of very young age) or readers that what they are about to hear or read is not necessarily true.

Further reading 
 Mohammad Ali Jazayery, Review: Modern Persian Prose Literature, Journal of the American Oriental Society, Vol. 90, No. 2, pp. 257 - 265 (1970). 
 Mohammad-Ali Jamalzadeh, Encyclopædia Britannica Online. www.britannica.com

1921 short story collections
Persian literature
Persian words and phrases
Iranian short story collections